Anne Cheynet (born 1938) is a French author in Réunion. Her 1977 work  is considered a significant contribution to Réunionnais literature, as the first novel to be formally labeled as "Réunionnais."

Biography 
Cheynet was born in Saint-Denis, Réunion, in 1938, and spent her childhood in the city's Saint-François neighborhood. She traveled to Aix-en-Provence to study in 1956, remaining abroad until 1963.

Back on the island, she worked as a secondary school teacher before getting involved in politics. She later returned to the classroom as a preschool teacher.

She published her first book, the poetry collection Matanans et Langoutis, in 1972, followed by her best-known work, the novel Les Muselés, which is considered the first work billed as a "Réunionnais novel." The novel, which has an activist slant, focuses on the lives of the poor in Réunion. Cheynet, who was from a poor white family, drew on her experiences of discrimination during the island's colonial era.

Cheynet has since published several other books, including the poetry collection Ter tout' kouler and the short story collection Rivages maouls.

Between 2001 and 2004, Cheynet produced three CDs of oral storytelling.

She writes in both French and Creole.

Selected works 
 Matanans et Langoutis (poetry), 1972
 Les Muselés (novel), L'Harmattan, 1977
 Ter tout' kouler : Poème pour la terre multicolore (poetry), vol. 1, Ravine des Sables, ADMV, 1992
 Rivages maouls : histoires d'Annabelle (autobiographical), vol. 1, Océan, 1994

References

External links 
 Interview with Anne Cheynet (in French)

1938 births
Living people
Writers from Réunion
20th-century French writers
20th-century French women writers